The Ministry of Digital Economy and Society (Abrv: MDES;), formerly known as the Ministry of Information and Communication Technology (MICT), is a cabinet ministry of Thailand. MICT was established on 3 October 2002 by the Administrative Reorganisation Act, 2002. The new ministry was created as the Ministry of Digital Economy and Society by the Re-organization of Ministry, Bureau and Department Act, B.E. 2558.

History
In September 2016, Ministry of Information and Communication Technology  (MICT) was dissolved and replaced by the Ministry of Digital Economy and Society. The ministry assumed the responsibilities of MICT. MICT's former agencies, the National Statistical Office of Thailand, the Thai Meteorological Department, the Electronic Transactions Development Agency, Thailand Post, TOT, and CAT Telecom, are to be transferred to the Ministry of Digital Economy and Society. The National Disaster Warning Center, formerly under MICT, is to be transferred to the Interior Ministry. MICT's Software Industry Promotion Agency (SIPA) was dissolved and some of its staff transferred to a newly established unit, the Digital Economy Promotion Agency under MDES.

In 2018 the ministry plans to set up a cybersecurity agency and hacker training centre. It will recruit at least 1,000 trainers to educate people in 24,700 villages nationwide to use information communication technology (ICT) to construct "national broadband villages".

Departments

Administration
 Office of the Minister
 Office of the Permanent Secretary

Dependent departments
Thai Meteorological Department
National Statistical Office of Thailand
Office of the National Digital Economy and Society Commission
Anti-Fake News Center

Public companies
 NT Public Company, Ltd
 Thailand Post Company, Ltd

Public organizations
 Electronic Transactions Development Agency
 Digital Economy Promotion Agency
National Cyber Security Agency
Office of the Personal Data Protection Commission

See also 
 List of ministries of Thailand
 Censorship in Thailand
 Internet censorship and surveillance by country – Thailand

References

External links 
MICT website

 
Digital Economy and Society
Information technology in Thailand
Communications in Thailand
Thailand
Digital Economy and Society
2002 establishments in Thailand